The elm borer (Saperda tridentata) is a species of beetle in the family Cerambycidae. It was described by Olivier in 1795. It is known from Canada and the United States. It feeds on Ulmus rubra and Ulmus americana. It acts as a vector for the fungus Ophiostoma ulmi, and as a host for the parasitoid wasp Cenocoelius saperdae.

References

tridentata
Beetles described in 1795